Parastrephia is a genus of South American plants in the tribe Astereae within the family Asteraceae.

Some Parastrephia species are allegedly used in traditional medicine.  For example, Parastrephia lucida is used in the highlands of the Andes to relieve toothache, for bone fractures and bruises, and as a vulnerary.

Species accepted by the Plants of the World Online as of December 2022: 
 Parastrephia lepidophylla (Wedd.) Cabrera - Argentina, Bolivia
 Parastrephia lucida (Meyen) Cabrera - Peru, Bolivia, northern Chile, northwestern Argentina
 Parastrephia phyliciformis (Meyen) Cabrera - Bolivia
 Parastrephia quadrangularis (Meyen) Cabrera - Bolivia, northern Chile, northwestern Argentina
 Parastrephia teretiuscula (Kuntze) Cabrera - Bolivia, Antofagasta Region of northern Chile

References

Asteraceae genera
Astereae
Flora of South America